The Central Steering Committee for Anti-Corruption was directly administered by the Vietnamese Politburo and chaired by the General Secretary of the Communist Party of Vietnam - Nguyễn Phú Trọng.

Members (2021-2026)

Chairman 
 Nguyễn Phú Trọng, General Secretary

Standing Vice Chairman 
 Phan Đình Trạc, Politburo member, Secretariat member, Head of the Commission for Internal Affairs

Vice Chairmen 
 Võ Văn Thưởng, Politburo member, Standing member of the Central Committee’s Secretariat
 Trương Thị Mai, Politburo member, Secretariat member, Head of Central Organization Commission
 Trần Cẩm Tú, Politburo member, Secretariat member, Chairman of the Central Inspection Commission
 Tô Lâm, Politburo member, Minister of Public Security
 Nguyễn Khắc Định, Central Committee member, Vice Chairman of the National Assembly

Members 
 Lương Cường, Politburo member, Head of the General Department of Politics, Ministry of Defense
 Nguyễn Hòa Bình, Politburo member, Secretariat member, Chief Justice of the Supreme People's Court of Vietnam
 Nguyễn Trọng Nghĩa, Secretariat member, Head of the Central Propaganda Department
 Đỗ Văn Chiến, Secretariat member, Chairman of the Vietnamese Fatherland Front
 Lê Minh Hưng, Secretariat member, Head of the Central Office
 Lê Minh Trí, Central Committee member, Prosecutor General of the Supreme People's Procuracy of Vietnam
 Trần Sỹ Thanh, Central Committee member, Auditor General
 Lê Thị Nga, Central Committee member, Chairwoman of the committee on Justice, National Assembly
 Đoàn Hồng Phong, Central Committee member, Government Inspector General
 Lê Thành Long, Central Committee member, Minister of Justice
 Võ Văn Dũng, Central Committee member, Standing Deputy Head of the Commission for Internal Affairs

Responsibilities

The committee accepted obligations, that included proposing the Politburo and the Secretariat for considering and deciding mechanisms, policies, laws and solutions on anti-corruption.  The Central Steering Committee is also in charge of discussing and deciding annual key working programs and plans on anti-corruption.

The committee can direct and work with relevant agencies in dealing with serious corruption cases.

The Central Committee for Internal Affairs is the standing agency of the committee.

Bibliography
 Quyết định số 162-QĐ/TW ngày 01/2/2013 về việc thành lập Ban Chỉ đạo Trung ương về phòng, chống tham nhũng (Decision 162-QD/TW dated 01/2/2013 on the establishment of the Central Steering Committee on Anti-corruption)

 
Government of Vietnam
Central Committee of the Communist Party of Vietnam
Anti-corruption agencies